The shifting balance theory is a theory of evolution proposed in 1932 by Sewall Wright, suggesting that adaptive evolution may proceed most quickly when a population divides into subpopulations with restricted gene flow.  The name of the theory is borrowed from Wright's metaphor of fitness landscapes (evolutionary landscapes), attempting to explain how a population may move across an adaptive valley to a higher adaptive peak.  According to the theory, this movement occurs in three steps:
Genetic drift allows a locally adapted subpopulation to move across an adaptive valley to the base of a higher adaptive peak.
Natural selection will move the subpopulation up the higher peak.
This new superiorly adapted subpopulation may then expand its range and outcompete or interbreed with other subpopulations, causing the spread of new adaptations and movement of the global population toward the new fitness peak.

Although shifting balance theory has been influential in evolutionary biology, inspiring the theories of quantum evolution and punctuated equilibrium, little empirical evidence exists to support the shifting balance process as an important factor in evolution.

References

Further reading

Wright, S. 1932. The roles of mutation, inbreeding, crossbreeding and selection in evolution. Proceedings of the 6th International Congress of Genetics: 356–366.

Evolutionary biology
Population genetics